Seto is a dialect of South Estonian spoken by 12,549 people. It is sometimes identified as a variety under Võro, or the two are described as Võro-Seto. Setos mostly inhabit the area near Estonia's southeastern border with Russia in Setomaa, and are primarily Eastern Orthodox, while Võros are traditionally Lutherans and live in historical Võru County.

Language sample 

Article 1 of the Universal Declaration of Human Rights:

 Seto:  
 Võro:  
 Estonian:  
 Finnish:  
 English: All human beings are born free and equal in dignity and rights. They are endowed with reason and conscience and should act towards one another in a spirit of brotherhood.

References 

 Alekseev, F. (2016) Opyt polevogo issledovanija jazyka seto. Finno-ugorskij mir. No. 3. 14–17.
 Eichenbaum, K.; Pajusalu, K. (2001): Setode ja võrokeste keelehoiakutest ja identiteedist. – Keel ja Kirjandus nr 7, lk. 483–489.
 Eller, K. (1999): Võro-Seto language. Võro Instituut'. Võro.

Seto
Estonian dialects
South Estonian language
Finnic languages
Vowel-harmony languages
Languages of Estonia